Paul Albert Zipfel (September 22, 1935 – July 14, 2019) was an American prelate of the Roman Catholic Church. He served as the sixth bishop of the Diocese of Bismarck in North Dakota from 1997 to 2011.  Zipfel served as an auxiliary bishop of the Archdiocese of Saint Louis from 1989 to 1996.

Biography

Early life 
Paul Zipfel was born on September 22, 1935, in St. Louis, Missouri, to Albert and Leona (née Rau) Zipfel. He had two older siblings, Ralph and Marion. Paul Zipfel attended St. Michael's Elementary School from 1940 to 1949, and afterwards entered the St. Louis Preparatory Seminary. Zipfel then studied at Kenrick Seminary in Shrewsbury, Missouri (1955–1957) and the Catholic University of America in Washington, D.C. (1957–1961).

Priesthood 
Zipfel was ordained to the priesthood for the Archdiocese of St. Louis on March 18, 1961.

Zipfel obtained his Licentiate of Sacred Theology in June 1961 and completed his graduate studies at Saint Louis University from 1963 to 1965, earning a Master of Education. From 1961 to 1989, Zipfel did pastoral work in the archdiocese as an associate pastor, pastor, teacher and administrator at various schools and parishes.

Auxiliary Bishop of St. Louis 
On May 16, 1989, Zipfel was appointed auxiliary bishop of St. Louis and Titular Bishop of Walla Walla by Pope John Paul II. He received his episcopal consecration on the following June 29 from Archbishop John May, with Bishops O'Donnell and Steib serving as co-consecrators.

Bishop of Bismarck 
Zipfel was named the sixth Bishop of Bismarck, North Dakota, on December 31, 1996, being installed on February 20, 1997.

Within the United States Conference of Catholic Bishops, Zipfel sat on the Administrative Committee and the Priestly Life and Ministry Committee.

In June 2002, Zipfel introduced a zero tolerance policy of sexual abuse allegations against priests in the diocese.  Anyone accused of abuse would be immediately removed from active ministry and reported to the police for investigation.

Retirement and legacy 
Zipfel's resignation as bishop of the Diocese of Bismarck was accepted by Pope Benedict XVI on October 19, 2011, and he was succeeded by David Kagan.  In retirement, Bishop Zipfel took up residence in Saint Joseph's Hall at the University of Mary in Bismarck, where he provided sacramental and spiritual service to students.

In 2012, Zipfel was diagnosed with dementia. His family and the Diocese of Bismarck decided to move him back to St. Louis to be closer to family. Zipfel lived at Mother of Good Counsel Home in Normandy, Missouri. Zipfel died on July 14, 2019.

See also
 

 Catholic Church hierarchy
 Catholic Church in the United States
 Historical list of the Catholic bishops of the United States
 List of Catholic bishops of the United States
 Lists of patriarchs, archbishops, and bishops

References

External links
Diocese of Bismarck
Diocese of Bismarck-archive

Episcopal succession

 

1935 births
2019 deaths
Kenrick–Glennon Seminary alumni
Catholic University of America alumni
Saint Louis University alumni
Roman Catholic Archdiocese of St. Louis
American people of German descent
Clergy from St. Louis
Roman Catholic bishops of Bismarck
20th-century Roman Catholic bishops in the United States
21st-century Roman Catholic bishops in the United States
Religious leaders from Missouri